Alan Erwin Ball (born May 13, 1957) is an American writer, director, and producer for television, film, and theater.

Ball wrote the screenplay for American Beauty, for which he earned an Academy Award for Best Original Screenplay. He also created the series Six Feet Under and True Blood, works for which he earned an Emmy as well as awards from the Writers, Directors, and Producers Guilds of America. He was an executive producer on the Cinemax television series Banshee. He also wrote and directed the film Uncle Frank.

Early life
Ball was born in Marietta, Georgia, to Frank and Mary Ball, respectively an aircraft inspector and a homemaker. His older sister, Mary Ann, was killed in a car accident when Ball was 13; he was in the passenger seat at the time. He attended high school in Marietta before going to college at the University of Georgia and Florida State University. Ball graduated from Florida State in 1980 with a degree in theater arts.

After college, he began work as a playwright at the General Nonsense Theater Company in Sarasota, Florida.

Film and television career
Ball broke into television as a writer and story editor on the situation comedies Grace Under Fire and Cybill.

Ball has written three films, American Beauty (1999), Towelhead (2007) and Uncle Frank (2020), the latter of which he also produced and directed. He is also the creator, writer and executive producer of the HBO drama series Six Feet Under and True Blood. Ball was the showrunner for True Blood for its first five seasons.

In 2010 Ball began work on a television adaptation of the crime noir novel The Mystic Arts of Erasing All Signs of Death by Charlie Huston, to be titled All Signs of Death. In December 2010, after several months of pre-production, HBO cancelled production on the project.

Ball was also one of the executive producers of the Cinemax series Banshee.

In July 2016, it was announced that Ball's family drama Here and Now had been ordered to series by HBO. Starring Tim Robbins and Holly Hunter, the show was cancelled in April 2018 after one ten-episode season.

Personal life
Ball has discussed his Buddhist faith in numerous interviews, noting how it has influenced his filmmaking. In an interview with Amazon.com, Ball commented on the plastic bag scene in American Beauty, stating: "I had an encounter with a plastic bag! And I didn't have a video camera, like Ricky does... There's a Buddhist notion of the miraculous within the mundane, and I think we certainly live in a culture that encourages us not to look for that." Ball has also discussed how his Buddhism has shaped themes in Six Feet Under and True Blood, both of which he has substantially contributed to.

Ball is gay and has been called "a strong voice for [the] LGBT community". In 2008 he made Out magazine's annual list of the 100 most impressive gay men and women.

Accolades
For his work in television and film, Ball has received critical acclaim and numerous awards and nominations, including an Academy Award, an Emmy a Golden Globe, and awards from the Writers, Directors, and Producers Guilds.

Awards
 2000 Academy Award for Best Original Screenplay – American Beauty
 2000 Golden Globe Award for Best Screenplay-Motion Picture – American Beauty
 2000 Writers Guild of America Award for Best Original Screenplay – American Beauty
 2002 Directors Guild of America Award for Outstanding Directorial Achievement in a Drama Series – Six Feet Under
 2002 Emmy Award for Outstanding Directing in a Drama Series – Six Feet Under
 2004 Producers Guild of America Award for Dramatic Series – Six Feet Under

Nominations
 2000 BAFTA Film Award for Best Original Screenplay – American Beauty
 2002 Directors Guild of America Award for Outstanding Directorial Achievement – Six Feet Under
 2004 Directors Guild of America Award for Outstanding Directorial Achievement – Six Feet Under
 2006 Emmy Award for Outstanding Directing in a Drama Series – Six Feet Under
 2006 Emmy Award for Outstanding Writing in a Drama Series – Six Feet Under
 2006 Writers Guild of America Award for Best Dramatic Series – Six Feet Under
 2009 Writers Guild of America Award for Best New Series – True Blood
 2010 Producers Guild of America Award for Dramatic Series – True Blood

Works

Television

Film

Theatre

References

Further reading

External links

 
 
 

1957 births
Living people
American Buddhists
20th-century American dramatists and playwrights
Film directors from Georgia (U.S. state)
American male screenwriters
American television directors
American television writers
Best Original Screenplay Academy Award winners
Florida State University alumni
American gay writers
LGBT Buddhists
Gay dramatists and playwrights
Gay screenwriters
Primetime Emmy Award winners
Showrunners
American LGBT screenwriters
American LGBT dramatists and playwrights
Writers from Atlanta
Writers Guild of America Award winners
Best Screenplay Golden Globe winners
Directors Guild of America Award winners
LGBT people from Georgia (U.S. state)
American male television writers
American male dramatists and playwrights
20th-century American male writers
Screenwriters from Georgia (U.S. state)
LGBT film directors
LGBT television directors
21st-century American LGBT people